The foreign relations  share the Bangladeshi government's policies in its external relations with the international community. The country pursues a moderate foreign policy that places heavy reliance on multinational diplomacy, especially at the United Nations and World Trade Organization (WTO). Since independence in 1971, the country has stressed its principle of "Friendship towards all, malice towards none" in dictating its diplomacy. As a member of the Non-Aligned Movement, Bangladesh has tended to not take sides with major powers. Since the end of the Cold War, the country has pursued better relations with regional neighbours.

The Bangladesh government has begun to implement a foreign policy that pursues regional economic integration in South Asia and aims to establish Bangladesh as a regional hub of transit trade in Asia.

Policy
The foreign Policy of Bangladesh consists of self-interest strategies chosen by the Constitution of the country to safeguard its national interests and to achieve goals within its international relations milieu. The Ministry of Foreign Affairs formulates and executes the policies according to the guidance from the relevant section of the Constitution of Bangladesh.

The fundamental Foreign Policies of Bangladesh originate from the article no. 25 of the Constitution of Bangladesh:

The State shall base its international relations on the principles of respect for national sovereignty and equality, non-interference in the internal affairs of other countries, peaceful settlements of international disputes, and respect for international law and the principles enunciated in the United Nations Charter, and on the basis of those principles shall-
 Strive for the renunciation of the use of force in international relations and for general and complete disarmament;
 Uphold the right of every people freely to determine and build up its own social, economic and political system by ways and means of its own free choice; and
 Support oppressed peoples throughout the world waging a just struggle against imperialism, colonialism or racialism.

Participation in multilateral organisations

Commonwealth of Nations

Bangladesh, which was part of British India until 1947, joined the Commonwealth of Nations in 1972 after its establishment as an independent nation in 1971. It has actively participated in the Heads of Government conferences that take place bi-annually.

United Nations

Bangladesh was admitted to the United Nations in 1974 and was elected to a Security Council term in 19781980 and again for a 200002 term. Foreign Minister Mr. Humayun Rasheed Choudhury served as president of the 41st UN General Assembly in 1986.

In recent years, Bangladesh has played a significant role in international peacekeeping activities. Nearly 10,000 Bangladeshi military personnel are deployed overseas on peacekeeping operations, making it a large contributor to the UN peacekeeping forces. Under UN auspices, Bangladeshi troops have served or are serving in Somalia, Rwanda, Mozambique, Kuwait, Bosnia and Herzegovina, and Haiti, and units are currently serving in Kuwait and East Timor. Bangladesh responded quickly to US President Bill Clinton's 1994 request for troops and police for the multinational force for Haiti and provided the largest non-US contingent. As of December 2021, Bangladesh is the largest provider of UN peacekeeping troops with 6608 personnel followed by Rwanda with 6335 personnel.

Non-Aligned Movement

Bangladesh was selected to provide the next chairman of NAM at the summit scheduled for Dhaka 2001, however it was later decided to host the summit at an alternative venue. As a member of the Non-aligned Movement Bangladesh never took any position in line with big powers. However it parted from its principle by voting against North Korea at the United Nations in December 2008, under pressure from Japan.

Organisation of Islamic Cooperation

 See also OIC role in Pakistan-Bangladesh relationship

In 1974, then Prime minister Bangabandhu Sheikh Mujibur Rahman, led a Bangladeshi delegation team consisting Kamal Hossain, Enayet Karim, Ataur Rahman Khan, Taheruddin Thakur, Tofail Ahmed and Shah Azizur Rahman to the international meeting of the Organisation of the Islamic Conference (OIC, now the Organisation of Islamic Cooperation) held in Lahore. Following this participation Bangladesh was admitted as a member of OIC. In 1977, President Ziaur Rahman amended the Constitution of Bangladesh, including a clause stating that " the state shall endeavour to consolidate, preserve and strengthen fraternal relations among Muslim countries based on Islamic solidarity ". Since then, an explicit goal of Bangladeshi foreign policy has been to seek close relations with other Islamic states. In 1980, President Ziaur Rahman was included in a 3-member "Al-Quds" summit committee to attend the summit at Morocco. In 1983, Bangladesh hosted in capital Dhaka the foreign ministers meeting of the OIC. At the OIC headquarters at Jeddah, Bangladesh is represented in the capacity of one of the Director Generals.

South Asian Association for Regional Cooperation

The government also pursued the expansion of co-operation among the nations of South Asia, bringing the process—an initiative of former President Ziaur Rahman—through its earliest, most tentative stages to the formal inauguration of the South Asian Association for Regional Cooperation (SAARC) at a summit gathering of South Asian leaders in Dhaka in December 1985. Bangladesh has served in the chairmanship of SAARC and has participated in a wide range of ongoing SAARC regional activities

Bay of Bengal Initiative for Multi-Sectoral Technical and Economic Cooperation

An international organisation which includes South Asian and Southeast Asian nations. The member nations of this group are: Bangladesh, India, Myanmar, Sri Lanka, Thailand, Bhutan and Nepal. The organisation focuses on regional economy, regional development and trade & investment.

Developing 8 Countries

Bangladesh is among the 8 member countries of this organisation. But no plans for expansion have been made by Bangladesh. The Developing 8 is an economic development alliance consisting of Muslim majority states which focuses in multiple areas which are rural development, science and technology, banking, agriculture, humanitarian development, energy, environment, health and finance. On 14 May 2006 in Bali, Indonesia, Bangladesh was the only nation not to sign a preferential trade agreement.

Asia Pacific Trade Agreement

The Asia-Pacific Trade Agreement (APTA), formerly known as the Bangkok Agreement, was signed in 1975 under one of the major initiatives taken by United Nations Economic and Social Commission for Asia and the Pacific (UNESCAP). Six Participating States- Bangladesh, China, India, Lao PDR, South Korea, and Sri Lanka are the parties to the APTA. In 2005, Bangladesh signed the APTA agreement which would enable it to reduce trade gaps between itself and other nations such as China, South Korea and its neighbour India. The APTA pact does occupy market for 2921.2 million people and the size of this big market accounts US$14615.86 billion in terms of Gross Domestic Product (GDP) in the Fiscal Year (FY) 2015–2016. APTA's key objective is to hasten economic development among the six participating states opting trade and investment liberalisation measures that will contribute to intra-regional trade and economic strengthening through the coverage of merchandise goods and services, synchronised investment regime and free flow of technology transfer making all the Participating States to be in equally winsome situation (Latifee, E. H., 2016). Another aspect of the agreement is to be given duty-free access to its products.

World Trade Organization

Bangladesh is an active member of the World Trade Organization (WTO). Bangladesh has a permanent mission in Geneva to look after matters relating to multilateral trading system under the WTO regime since the mid-1990s.

World Customs Organization

Bangladesh is an active member of the World Customs Organization (WCO). Bangladesh has a permanent representative to WCO which has its headquarters in Brussels.

Like Minded Group

Bangladesh has formed an alliance with nineteen other developing countries to vote as a bloc in organisations such as the WTO and the United Nations.

Other

Bangladesh is currently chairman of the Developing 8 Countries. The government has participated in numerous international conferences, especially those dealing with population, food, development, and women's issues. In 198283, Bangladesh played a constructive role as chairman of the "Group of 77", an informal association encompassing most of the world's developing nations. It has taken a leading role in the "Group of 48" developing countries. Bangladesh also participates in these international organisations:
ARF, AsDB, BIMSTEC, CP, FAO, IAEA, IBRD, ICAO, ICC, ICCt (signatory), ICRM, IDA, IDB, IFAD, IFC, IFRCS, IHO, ILO, IMF, IMO, Interpol, IOC, IOM, IPU, ISO, ITU, ITUC, MIGA, MINURSO, MONUC, SACEP, UNCTAD, UNESCO, UNHCR, UNIDO, UNMEE, UNMIL, UNMIS, UNOCI, UNOMIG, UNWTO, UPU, WCL, WCO, WFTU, WHO, WIPO, WMO, WTO, OPCW.

Bilateral relations

Bangladesh have established official diplomatic relations with most of the members of United Nations as well as some non-UN members like Palestine. Relations with these nations are largely cordial except for some bilateral disputes with Pakistan and Burma. Issue with India stem from teesta and other river water sharing and border killings. Bangladesh puts deep emphasis on relations with China and the United States as China is the largest military supplier to Bangladesh while United States is one of the largest export markets for Bangladeshi products. In recent years, the relations with Russia also became influential because of the Russian loan and technical assistance on military modernisation and the first ever nuclear power plant project of Bangladesh. The bilateral relations of Bangladesh are mainly based on trade activities. However, with certain countries, the relations expand to other areas such as military co-operation, cultural exchange etc.

Asia

South Asia

Bangladesh maintains friendly relations with Bhutan, Maldives, Nepal, Sri Lanka and India. It strongly opposed the Soviet invasion of Afghanistan. Bangladesh and Nepal had agreed to facilitate land transit between the two countries.

Southeast Asia

East Asia

Central Asia

Western Asia (Middle East)

During the Bangladesh Liberation War, the majority of conservative Arab nations were against Bangladeshi liberation because India- a non-Muslim nation was supporting break up of a Muslim country (Pakistan). Non-Arab Muslim nations such as Indonesia and Turkey established relations quickly. In the present, Bangladesh maintains relations to the Middle East through many areas such as commerce, history, military and most importantly religious ties which enabled the two to co-operate more easily then compared to their Western or Far Eastern partners. Bangladesh supplies over 1 million guest workers to Saudi Arabia, United Arab Emirates, Kuwait and other Gulf countries. In turn, most of Bangladesh's oil is imported from this region. Islamic countries and charities provide economic aid usually to advance the Islamic agenda, including funding mosques and madrassas.

During the Yom Kippur War, Bangladesh supported the Arabs and Palestinians and sent a medical team and relief supply which was appreciated. In return they enabled Bangladesh to become a member of NAM at the Algiers Summit in 1973 and pressured Pakistan into recognising Bangladesh to get Mujib to go to the 1974 OIC Summit in Lahore, as he stated that was his only condition.

Bangladesh also took active part in trying to broker a ceasefire between Iran and Iraq during their eight-year war as a member of the United Nations Security Council and participating in the UNIIMOG mission which they became Acting Head of in the last few years before withdrawal. It later helped them to be elected into the OIC Peace Committee.

Bangladesh strongly opposed the Israeli bombardment of South Lebanon which killed approximately 1,191 civilians and described it as "State Terrorism" and a double standard conflict going into detail that a non-western nation would have been labelled a terrorist and a western nation would have never been deemed a terrorist. They also contributed to the peacekeeping effort after the 2006 Lebanon War by sending in battalions of infantry.

Africa

Bangladesh's presence in Africa is mostly due to their large contribution to the peacekeeping forces present around the continent such as Liberia, Sierra Leone, Ivory Coast, Sudan (Darfur) and Somalia. Bangladesh can foster ties based on its history such as nations in Southeast Africa where there is a South Asian population (whose ancestors immigrated there during the British Empire). In countries such as Ivory Coast and Sierra Leone, Bangladeshi peacekeepers have been honoured. It is currently trying to increase ties with the southern economic bloc in Southern Africa with nations such as Zimbabwe.

Europe
European countries, particularly from Scandinavia, provide significant economic assistance to Bangladesh.
Bangladesh's relations with the European Union and its member states remained a priority area in the foreign policy context. A number of achievements were made in the economic field during that brief period. At present EU is the top export destination of Bangladesh's products (48% of the total product). The International Jute Study Group—which comprises the EU, Bangladesh, and India—is established in Dhaka. Bangladesh successfully participated in World Apparel Fair, European Seafood Exposition, Bangladesh Trade Show in Moscow and Kiev.

North America and the Caribbean

South and Central America

Disputes – international

India

 Sharing the water of the Teesta
 Ganges Barrage Project
 Border killings of Bangladeshi civilians

Pakistan

 Apologizing for 1971 Bangladesh genocide.
 Trial of War Criminals during 1971
 Relocating Stranded Pakistanis in Bangladesh who are left behind since 1971.

Myanmar

 Steps to repatriate Rohingya people refugees who fled from Rakhine State.

Allies 

Bangladesh maintains a foreign policy that dictates friendship to all malice to none. So, a black and white approach to identify allies and enemies in case of Bangladesh is not really an appropriate approach. Still Bangladesh has notable extra ordinary good relations with some countries. A few example should include relations with India, China, Japan, Russia, United Kingdom, United States, Malaysia, and South Korea. 

Bangladesh does not really have problematic relations with any country. However, Bangladesh has a decades long border dispute and water sharing disagreement with India. Some level of solutions came in  2015 as to border issues as both countries agreed to co-operate more and maintain friendly ties but the water sharing issue remains unsolved. In addition, following Rohingyas refugees flow especially after 2017 Bangladesh seems to experience difficult relations with Myanmar, however skillful diplomacy on behalf of Bangladesh hold it from getting worse.  As the Rohingya issue remains unsolved, it signals a warning for the future.

See also 

 List of diplomatic missions in Bangladesh
 List of diplomatic missions of Bangladesh
 Visa requirements for Bangladeshi citizens
 Visa policy of Bangladesh

References

Further reading
 Choudhury, G.W. India, Pakistan, Bangladesh, and the Major Powers: Politics of a Divided Subcontinent (1975), relations with US, USSR and China.

 The Maritime Boundary Dispute Between Bangladesh and Myanmar: Motivations, Potential Solutions, and Implications by Jared Bissinger (Asia Policy, July 2010)

External links 

 Ministry of Foreign Affairs. Government of Bangladesh

 
Bangladesh and the Commonwealth of Nations